Eucosma gloriola, the eastern pine shoot borer, is a moth of the family Tortricidae. It is found from eastern Canada, south to Virginia, and west to Minnesota.

The wingspan is 14–16 mm. The forewings are coppery red with two transverse grey bands. There is one generation per year.

The larvae feed on Pinus species, mainly Pinus strobus and Pinus sylvestris. First instar larvae enter shoots behind needle fascicles, boring directly into the pith. They initially feed downward toward the base of the shoots but later reverse direction. The frass is deposited on either end of the tunnel. Pupation takes place in a silken cocoon on the ground.

Gallery

References

Eucosmini
Moths described in 1931